The 2001 Central American and Caribbean Championships in Athletics were held at the Estadio Mateo Flores in Guatemala City, Guatemala between 20–22 July.

Medal summary

Full results were published.

Men's events

Women's events

A = affected by altitude

Medal table

See also
 2001 in athletics (track and field)

References

External links
 Men's medalists – GBR Athletics
 Women's medalists – GBR Athletics
 Results

Central American and Caribbean Championships in Athletics
Central American and Caribbean Championships
Central American and Caribbean Championships
International athletics competitions hosted by Guatemala
Athletic
Athletic